The 2016 Guangzhou Power season was the first season for the arena football franchise in the China Arena Football League (CAFL). The team was coached by Ernesto Purnsley and played their home games at Guangzhou Gymnasium.

Standings

Schedule

Regular season

Roster

References

Guangzhou Power
Guangzhou Power
2016 in Chinese sport